Francisco Javier "Fran" Fernández Díaz (born 20 March 1980) is a Spanish football manager, who is currently in charge of Alcorcón.

Career
Fernández started his career at Polideportivo Aguadulce, as a director of football and manager. He subsequently acted as an assistant manager at AD Adra and CD Español del Alquián before being named manager of AD Parador in 2009.

In November 2011, Fernández was appointed Héctor Berenguel's assistant at Polideportivo Ejido in Segunda División B, but the club subsequently folded in the same campaign. The following July he joined UD Almería, initially in charge of the Cadete squad.

After progressing through the club's youth setup, Fernández was appointed manager of the reserves in Tercera División on 29 June 2016. On 28 February of the following year, he was named manager of the main squad, after the dismissal of Fernando Soriano.

Fernández's first professional match in charge occurred on 5 March 2017, a 2–1 Segunda División away win against CD Lugo. His tenure ended nine days later, after the appointment of Luis Miguel Ramis.

Fernández was in charge of the first team in an interim manner for one more occasion during the 2017–18 season, replacing fired Ramis. On 24 April 2018, after Lucas Alcaraz's resignation, he was appointed manager of the main squad until the end of the campaign, managing to avoid relegation in the last matchday on head-to-head points with Cultural Leonesa.

On 20 May 2019, after taking his club to a comfortable mid-table finish, Fernández announced that he would not renew his contract with the Rojiblancos, due to expire in June. On 1 July, he took over fellow league team AD Alcorcón, replacing fired Cristóbal Parralo.

Fernández left Alkor as his contract expired, and was appointed at the helm of CD Tenerife on 29 July 2020. He was relieved of his duties on 22 November, after a 0–1 home loss against UD Logroñés.

On 2 November 2021, Fernández returned to Alkor, becoming their third manager of the season with the side rock-bottom of the standings.

Managerial statistics

References

External links

1980 births
Living people
Sportspeople from Almería
Spanish football managers
Segunda División managers
Tercera División managers
UD Almería B managers
UD Almería managers
AD Alcorcón managers
CD Tenerife managers